Hemibagrus microphthalmus is a species of catfish found in the Irrawaddy, Sittang and Salween rivers of India, Myanmar and Thailand.

References

External links 
http://www.fishbase.org/summary/13307

Bagridae
Catfish of Asia
Freshwater fish of Asia
Fish of India
Fish of Myanmar
Fish of Thailand
Irrawaddy River
Fish described in 1877